Bigger Cages, Longer Chains is an EP by The (International) Noise Conspiracy.

Track listing
"Bigger Cages, Longer Chains"
"Beautiful So Alone"
"Baby Doll" (N.E.R.D cover)
"Waiting For Salvation"
"A Textbook Example"
"When Words Are Not Working"

References

2002 EPs
The (International) Noise Conspiracy albums
Burning Heart Records EPs
Epitaph Records EPs